Swedish Ski Team may refer to:

Swedish Bikini Team, a fictional group used in Old Milwaukee beer commercials in 1991
Ski Team Sweden, the national skiing team of Sweden